SR72 may refer to:

 Lockheed Martin SR-72, a proposed hypersonic airplane under development by Lockheed Martin
 State Route 72, several highways numbered 72 in the US